Nudaria phallustortens is a moth of the subfamily Arctiinae first described by Jeremy Daniel Holloway in 2001. It is found on Borneo, Peninsular Malaysia and possibly Java.

The length of the forewings is 8–10 mm.

References

Nudariina